László Vágner (born December 24, 1955 in Gávavencsellő) is a Hungarian former football referee.

He refereed two matches in the 1998 FIFA World Cup in France: Scotland v Norway at the Parc de Lescure in Bordeaux, and Chile v Cameroon at the Stade de la Beaujoire in Nantes.

References 

Profile

1955 births
Hungarian football referees
FIFA World Cup referees
1998 FIFA World Cup referees
Living people